Fazlur Rahman Potol (died 11 August 2016) was a Bangladesh Nationalist Party politician and a 4-term Jatiya Sangsad member representing the Natore-1 constituency. He also served as the state minister of Youth, Sports and Communications.

References

2016 deaths
Bangladesh Nationalist Party politicians
State Ministers of Youth and Sports (Bangladesh)
5th Jatiya Sangsad members
6th Jatiya Sangsad members
7th Jatiya Sangsad members
8th Jatiya Sangsad members
Place of birth missing
Date of birth missing